is a 2022 action-adventure game developed by PlatinumGames and published by Nintendo for the Nintendo Switch. It was directed by Yusuke Miyata and produced by Yuji Nakao, with the Bayonetta creator Hideki Kamiya as supervising director. It was announced in December 2017, and was released on October 28, 2022. The game follows the titular angel-hunting witch Bayonetta, who must face against man-made bioweapons called Homunculi, and an entity known as the Singularity which threatens to destroy the multiverse. She is assisted by an ensemble of characters, including a coven of alternate universe versions of herself; and a new witch-in-training named Viola.

Following its initial announcement at The Game Awards 2017, news on the game went dormant while PlatinumGames worked to release games such as Astral Chain, which was developed concurrently. The game had its first full reveal with gameplay in September 2021 during a Nintendo Direct presentation. Bayonetta's original voice actor, Hellena Taylor, was replaced by Jennifer Hale after a pay dispute. The game received generally favorable reviews from critics, with praise for the gameplay, but criticism for the story, camera controls, and performance issues.

Gameplay

Bayonetta 3, like its predecessors, is an action hack and slash game in which players control the eponymous protagonist Bayonetta as she combats various enemies using a combination of melee attacks and gunplay. Dodging enemy attacks at the last second triggers a state known as "Witch Time", during which time and enemies slow down, allowing Bayonetta to continually attack them without interruption, or traverse in real-time to solve environmental puzzles. Unique to this game are the "Demon Slave" and "Demon Masquerade" mechanics, the former of which differs from the preceding Climax Summon and Umbran Climax features in the first two titles, and instead allows players to take direct control of one of Bayonetta's Infernal Demons to perform various attacks and special abilities, some of which are advantageous to particular scenarios depending on the demon being controlled. The latter meanwhile, allows Bayonetta to directly fuse with a summoned Infernal Demon, granting her access to magic-based abilities, including new attack and traversal options. A new playable character, Viola, can only activate Witch Time through the use of a parry mechanic, and whose only Demon Slave Cheshire cannot be manually controlled. When Viola summons Cheshire, she switches from a sword-based fighting style to a fist-based fighting style.

In addition to the game's standard presentation, a new display mode known as the "Naive Angel Mode" is introduced. This mode conceals displays of nudity during gameplay and cinematics, such as Bayonetta's various dances to summon her Wicked Weaves using her clothing as a conduit, as well as the more graphic designs of certain enemies and demons.

Story

Settings and characters
The universe of Bayonetta is set in a location known as Trinity of Realities, which comprises Paradiso, the realm of angels; Inferno, the realm of demons; and the World of Chaos, the human world. The World of Chaos is composed of multiple alternate universes, which makes for the main setting of Bayonetta 3. The titular witch Bayonetta — known also by her real name Cereza — returns as its protagonist, an Umbran Witch who makes contracts with demons to fight angels. She is joined by a witch-in-training Viola, who fights alongside her demon familiar Cheshire. They team up in order to fight against the forces of man-made artificial weapons called "Homunculi"; led by an artificial entity known as "Singularity", which seeks to eliminate all worlds in the multiverse to strengthen itself and conquer the Trinity of Realities. The two are assisted by Bayonetta's childhood friend and fellow Umbran witch Jeanne, the investigative reporter Luka, the information broker Enzo, and the demonic arms dealer Rodin.

Plot
An alternate universe Bayonetta fights against Singularity, but is killed as Viola watches and inherits the last of her power. Viola is tasked by her commanding officer Sigurd to use a world bridge to escape to another universe, and to seek help in the battle against Singularity. Viola uses the world bridge and escapes as Sigurd is killed, arriving in a universe where Bayonetta and Jeanne witness the Homunculi launching their attack on New York City. Taking refuge with Enzo in Rodin's bar the Gates of Hell, Viola explains that the Homunculi and Singularity have already destroyed countless alternate universes; Rodin confirms that if all universes collapse, Singularity will have ultimate power over the Trinity of Realities. To stop Singularity, Bayonetta and Viola must travel to the island of Thule, which serves as a gateway between universes, and collect the Chaos Gears that can lead them to the "Alphaverse" where Singularity resides. Jeanne is tasked with infiltrating a research facility to locate their universe's version of Sigurd, a doctor and scientist with knowledge about the multiverse.

Bayonetta and Viola arrive at Thule and fight across several alternate universes. During the travels, Bayonetta pursues alternate universe incarnations of herself who are protecting their own worlds, and fights alongside them to obtain the Chaos Gears; each is ultimately killed and absorbed by a vessel of Singularity, who is pursuing each Bayonetta incarnation as the "Arch-Eve", which can influence reality. Viola ends up pursuing Luka, who has been following them throughout the multiverse. Viola discovers that the deaths of his counterparts across the multiverse has caused Luka to transform into a wolf-like beast known as Strider, influenced by the rage of the Alphaverse's incarnation dubbed Dark Adam. During the game Viola reveals she is the daughter of her universe's Bayonetta and Luka, and encounters an alternate Luka dubbed "Lukaon", king of the faeries with knowledge of the multiverse. Jeanne manages to retrieve Sigurd and reconvenes with Bayonetta and Viola on Thule. Using the Chaos Gears, Sigurd opens up a portal into the Alphaverse, allowing Bayonetta and Viola access. Upon their arrival, they discover that Singularity's real identity was the Alphaverse's Sigurd, an artificial human who sought absolute power over the multiverse.

Singularity, who was impersonating Sigurd, kills Jeanne and traps Bayonetta and Viola in the Alphaverse. Luka reaches the Alphaverse too, with Bayonetta defeating Dark Adam and Lukaon restoring Luka's mind and allowing him to become "Arch-Adam", a guide to the Arch-Eve. Bayonetta, identified by Singularity as "Arch-Eve Origin", pursues and fights Singularity, freeing the spirits of Jeanne and the other Bayonettas, who briefly aid her before vanishing. She is then aided by incarnations of herself from Bayonetta and Bayonetta 2, and finally kills Singularity with help from Viola, Luka and a final Demon Summoning; Singularity's death restores the multiverse. Bayonetta, wounded and exhausted, loses control of Gomorrah and her soul is knocked from her body. Luka subdues the summon and embraces Bayonetta, restoring her body; they are dragged into Inferno, leaving Viola behind. Post-credits sequences show Viola defeating Dark Eve, a remnant of the Alphaverse's Bayonetta, and being given the "Bayonetta" title as a final message from Bayonetta; and later going to school in New York while taking on jobs for Rodin.

Development
In July 2013, PlatinumGames executive and series creator Hideki Kamiya responded to a fan question on Twitter regarding the likelihood of a third game in the Bayonetta series in the event the then-upcoming Bayonetta 2 was a success, stating, "I hope so". Bayonetta 2 director Yusuke Hashimoto was interviewed by the magazine outlet GamesMaster, during which was asked about what game sequels he would like to work on, to which he answered that he had "all kinds of ideas" in mind for Bayonetta 3 in addition to a potential spin-off title. In June 2015 following Bayonetta 2s release, Kamiya again responded to a fan inquiry regarding the character Jeanne, and what potential new hairstyles she would look good in following her appearances in the first two games. Kamiya replied, "The answer will be in Bayo 3".

Bayonetta 3 was announced by Nintendo in December 2017 during that year's The Game Awards alongside Nintendo Switch versions of Bayonetta and Bayonetta 2, confirming the title as in development for the Switch in addition to Nintendo's involvement as its publisher. Then-President and COO of Nintendo of America Reggie Fils-Aimé remarked on the announcement as celebratory for "the fans who love what PlatinumGames does, and are thrilled to have PlatinumGames back on a Nintendo system". In June 2022, Hideki Kamiya reiterated his recommendation that newcomers play the preceding two games in preparation for Bayonetta 3, as despite there being "no reason why you won't be able to follow the story and enjoy it if you start with Bayonetta 3", he felt that prior experience with the series would help players find the third game "more interesting".

In April 2018, studio head Atsushi Inaba told Eurogamer at the Reboot Develop 2018 conference that Bayonetta 3 would mark a "turning point" for the developer, mentioning that the game would be a "linear core progression action game" in a similar vein to its predecessors. In February 2019 during an installment of Nintendo Direct, Nintendo revealed Astral Chain (2019), another action-adventure title from PlatinumGames for the Switch that was released later that August. Despite the reveal of an additional title in development at the studio however, Nintendo Switch general producer Yoshiaki Koizumi who presented the Direct, would reassure that the game would not conflict with Bayonetta 3s development, stating that PlatinumGames were still "hard at work" on the title.

Inaba was interviewed by Video Games Chronicle (VGC) in May 2019, and described the game's production as an "orthodox development process", additionally remarking that players would be able to easily observe the shifts in the studio's production mentality during gameplay, yet refusing to elaborate further. Inaba was again interviewed by the publication during E3 2019, clarifying the game's status as "going quite well".

Bayonetta 3 was unveiled by Nintendo during a Direct presentation in September 2021, revealing the first look at gameplay and its 2022 release window. The trailer additionally confirmed Yusuke Miyata as the game's director while Hideki Kamiya will be executive director. Miyata's involvement prompted speculation that a mechanic revolving around individually controlling Bayonetta's Infernal Demon summons in combat, was in fact derived from a previously cancelled PlatinumGames project, Scalebound, an action role-playing game published by Microsoft Studios intended to release for Xbox One and Microsoft Windows, as Miyata previously served as that game's lead designer. Fans additionally noted the resemblance between a new character masked in shadow during the end of the trailer, and Scalebounds intended playable protagonist, Drew. A blog post on PlatinumGames' website confirmed additional staff involved in the game, including cinematic supervisors Yuji Shimomura and Masaki Suzumura, as well as artist Mari Shimazaki, all reprising their respective roles from the previous two games.

A second trailer was released on July 13, 2022, confirming the game's October 28 launch date, and key story and character details, notably unveiling the new character Viola, the presence of alternate versions of Bayonetta, and the return of supporting characters Luka, Enzo, Jeanne and Rodin. In commemoration of the game's launch, Nintendo announced that a physical edition of the original Bayonetta on Nintendo Switch would be available in limited quantities on September 30, 2022 via select retailers and the My Nintendo Store. This would be the first time the game was available in a standalone physical format outside the Special Edition box set collecting the first game and its sequel, which released in 2018.

Voice acting controversy 
Hellena Taylor, the voice actress for Bayonetta in previous games, was replaced by Jennifer Hale for Bayonetta 3. Miyata said this was due to "various overlapping circumstances". She urged her fans to boycott the game and instead donate to charity.

On Twitter, Kamiya said that Taylor's statements were untrue, "sad[,] and deplorable". He blocked many Twitter users who responded to his tweet, and then temporarily deactivated his personal twitter, leading to speculation that he was suspended. Hale stated on Twitter that while she was in a non-disclosure agreement, she expressed her belief that actors should be paid well, and emphasized her past advocacy for her peers within the profession. She further urged people to keep an open mind about the amount of work that had gone into the game. Hale's involvement drew responses from voice actors such as David Hayter and Steve Blum, who spoke in support of her industry work and due diligence. PlatinumGames issued a formal response confirming that they align themselves with Hale's statement; asking people to refrain from disrespecting Hale or any of the contributors to the franchise, and stating "we give our full support to Jennifer Hale as the new Bayonetta".

The reports said negotiations ended after Taylor requested a six-figure payment and royalties instead, and that Taylor had refused an offer to make a cameo for the fee of one session once Hale was cast. Taylor called the report "an absolute lie, and a complete joke" made to "save [Platinum's] ass and the game", and said she wished to be done with the affair and the franchise. Jason Schreier, the reporter who wrote the October 18 article for Bloomberg News, noted that these tweets from Taylor effectively corroborated the report.

Release
Bayonetta 3 was released on Nintendo Switch on October 28, 2022. Alongside the standard physical and digital releases of the game, a special edition box set known as the "Trinity Masquerade Edition" was made available at select retailers, or online through the My Nintendo Store. It features a copy of the game, accompanied by a 200-page, full color artbook with concept illustrations of the game's various demons, and alternate physical cover sleeves for the three Bayonetta games.

Reception 

Bayonetta 3 received  "generally favorable" reviews from critics, according to review aggregator Metacritic.

The combat received widespread praise from reviewers. Mitchell Saltzman, writing for IGN, described it as, "one of the best combat systems in gaming". GameSpots Jessica Howard described the gameplay as being "lightning-fast and smooth yet accommodates for different playstyles and skill levels". Chris Carter of Destructoid added how "seamless" the combat was and highlighted the game's wealth of content. The game's levels were also noted by Nintendo Life as being larger than prior games in the series, and that the game had greater replayability through challenges, collectibles, and unlockable modes.

Some reviewers criticized the game's performance and technical issues, such as an inconsistent framerate, long loading times, and occasional low-quality textures. Negative opinions were also directed at the game's camera, being labelled as "frustrating" and "annoying". The story and characterization of its titular protagonist in comparison to the game's predecessors drew some criticism.

Sales 

Bayonetta 3 sold 41,285 physical copies within its first week of release in Japan, making it the second bestselling retail game of the week in the country. In the United Kingdom, Bayonetta 3 was the third best-selling game in its release week behind Call of Duty: Modern Warfare II and FIFA 23. According to NPD in the United States, Bayonetta 3 was the second best-selling Nintendo Switch title in October 2022 under Mario + Rabbids Sparks of Hope, as well as the ninth overall across all game platforms. In February 2023, Nintendo reported that Bayonetta 3 had sold over one million copies worldwide.

Accolades

Notes

References

External links

Bayonetta 3 at Nintendo.com

Bayonetta
Nintendo Switch games
Nintendo Switch-only games
Kaiju video games
2022 video games
Nintendo games
Video game controversies
Video games developed in Japan
Video games about demons
Video games about witchcraft
Video games featuring female protagonists
Action-adventure games
Hack and slash games
Video games about parallel universes
Video game sequels
PlatinumGames games
The Game Awards winners